This is an incomplete list of the highest settlements in the world. Only settlements that are permanently occupied all year long with a significant population and lying at least partially above an elevation of 3,700 metres (12,140 feet) are included.

Highest settlements

This section lists all the settlements with a significant year-round population above .

Settlements below 

[Lachen] [India] [3488m]

See also
List of highest towns by country
List of capital cities by altitude
List of highest large cities in the world

References

Settlements
Geography-related lists of superlatives